The 2011 Città di Como Challenger was a professional tennis tournament played on clay courts. It was the sixth edition of the tournament which was part of the 2011 ATP Challenger Tour. It took place in Como, Italy between 29 August and 4 September 2011.

ATP entrants

Seeds

 1 Rankings are as of August 22, 2011.

Other entrants
The following players received wildcards into the singles main draw:
  Federico Delbonis
  Daniele Giorgini
  Matteo Trevisan

The following players received entry as an alternate into the singles main draw:
  Martín Alund
  Iñigo Cervantes-Huegun
  Axel Michon
  Gianluca Naso
  Philipp Oswald

The following players received entry as a special exemption into the singles main draw:
  Peter Gojowczyk

The following players received entry from the qualifying draw:
  Benjamin Balleret
  Antonio Comporto
  Niels Desein
  Guillermo Durán
  Boris Pašanski
  Pedro Sousa
  Simon Stadler

Champions

Singles

 Pablo Carreño Busta def.  Andreas Beck, 6–4, 7–6(7–4)

Doubles

 Federico Delbonis /  Renzo Olivo def.  Martín Alund /  Facundo Argüello, 6–1, 6–4

External links
Official Website
ITF Search
ATP official site

Citta di Como Challenger
Città di Como Challenger
Città di Como Challenger
Città di Como Challenger
Clay court tennis tournaments
Città di Como Challenger